The 2007–08 Northern Counties East Football League season was the 26th in the history of Northern Counties East Football League, a football competition in England.

Premier Division

The Premier Division featured 15 clubs which competed in the previous season, along with five new clubs, promoted from Division One:
Lincoln Moorlands, who also merged with Lincoln League club Lincoln Railway to form Lincoln Moorlands Railway
Nostell Miners Welfare
Parkgate
South Normanton Athletic
Winterton Rangers

League table

Division One

Division One featured 12 clubs which competed in the previous season, along with five clubs.
Clubs joined from the Central Midlands League:
Barton Town Old Boys
Bottesford Town
Rainworth Miners Welfare

Plus:
Leeds Met Carnegie, joined from the West Yorkshire League
Scarborough Athletic, new club formed after Conference North club Scarborough folded.

League table

References

External links
 Northern Counties East Football League

2007-08
9